The San Diego Lions is a United States Australian Football League team, based in San Diego, United States. It was founded in 1997. They play in the Californian Australian Football League.

References

External links
 

Australian rules football clubs in the United States
Lions
Australian rules football clubs established in 1997
1997 establishments in California